Radretumab is an antineoplastic. Philogen, a pharmaceutical company specializing in antibody-drug conjugates, is developing it as a conjugate of Iodine-131 to an antibody which binds to fibronectin extra domain-B for treatment of Hodgkin lymphoma.

References 

Monoclonal antibodies
Experimental cancer drugs